Walker v Syfret NO 1911 AD 141 is an important case in  South African insolvency law.

Facts 
When L Co was wound up, JW (the plaintiff's brother) was the holder of debentures for 28,000 pounds, which the company had issued before its liquidation. His claim on the debentures was extinguished, however, on account of a debt of at least 55,000 pounds, which he owed to the company.

Subsequently, JW transferred the debentures to the plaintiff, who was aware that the company was in liquidation and that his brother personally could not recover on the debentures.

The plaintiff sued for an order compelling the liquidator to admit and rank his claim for payment. The plaintiff maintained that, because the debentures were negotiable instruments, his claim, unlike that of his brother, was not subject to set-off.

See also 
 South African insolvency law

References 
 Walker v Syfret NO 1911 AD 141

Notes 

1911 in South African law
1911 in case law
South African insolvency case law
Appellate Division (South Africa) cases